Elizabeth College is a government comprehensive senior secondary school located in Hobart, Tasmania, Australia. Established in 1911 as the Elizabeth Street School and known as Elizabeth College since 1985, the college caters for approximately 1,000 students in Years 11 and 12 and is administered by the Tasmanian Department of Education.

In 2019 student enrolments were 959. The college principal in 2022 is Shane Fuller.

History
From 1842 onwards, a school was established when Holy Trinity Church constructed a small school of two classrooms on the site.  This school, known as Trinity Hill School, became the Elizabeth Street School in 1911. This school became known as a practising school for newly graduated teachers from the University of Tasmania, where students were taught in primary education. In 1918, the school was used as a hospital during the Spanish Influenza epidemic.

After World War II, the school became known as the Elizabeth Street Secondary Modern School, and taught girls and boys in secondary education. In 1968, the Elizabeth Matriculation College was established when the high school was re-built to accommodate senior students wishing to study for the newly created Higher School Certificate. In 1985, the school became known as Elizabeth College.

Subjects
The subjects that are taught at Elizabeth College fall within the curriculum of the Office of Tasmanian Assessment, Standards & Certification (TASC). Courses available at the college include Visual Arts, Performing Arts, Science, Mathematics, Languages, Media Production, Humanities, and many more. Upon successful completion of studies at the college, students are awarded the Tasmanian Certificate of Education.

Students are able to enroll in whichever courses they desire. A full-time workload is expected of all students in Tasmania until the age of 18 or completion of Year 12. However, to earn a Tasmanian Certificate of Education, they must pass at least one course that involves Numeracy and one that involves Literacy, with many courses covering these requirements.

Facilities
Facilities at the college include a large library/study area in the centre of the campus, a gymnasium and many computer laboratories. These are used extensively and are often required for coursework.

Extra facilities include a weights training room, theatre, photographic darkrooms, MDT and auto workshops, and Student Services block. This area offers counselling and security services to students and the college. Staff here include a college chaplain, a security officer and college police officer, as well as counsellors.

The college also has a large cafeteria where activities for Harmony Day and other charitable events are held throughout the year. Adjacent to the cafeteria is Tang Cafe, which used primarily by students of Food Technology. There is also a student common room in H Block.

International co-operation
Elizabeth College has ties across the world, including China and Japan. Every year there is a school trip organised to both China and Japan.

Elizabeth College has a sister school in Hiroshima, Japan called Inokuchi Senior High and in China called Quanzhou Foreign Language School. There are cultural exchanges to both of these schools on an annual and biannual bases and the schools visit the college.

Notable alumni 
Scott Bacon, a former politician who represented the electorates of Denison and then Clark in the Tasmanian House of Assembly as a member of the Labor Party

References

External links
Elizabeth College

Colleges in Tasmania
Public high schools in Hobart
Educational institutions established in 1911
1911 establishments in Australia